Kellalac is a locality near Warracknabeal in Victoria, Australia. Kellalac has a bushland reserve. The locality has a joint cricket team with Brim and Sheep Hills.

References

Towns in Victoria (Australia)
Wimmera